The 1989–90 FDGB-Pokal was the 39th and penultimate East German Cup, the last before reunification. The competition was won by Dynamo Dresden, who sealed their seventh cup win, and the Double, when they beat second tier team Dynamo Schwerin.

Preliminary round

First round

2nd round

Round of 16

Quarter-finals

Semi-finals

Final

External links 
 DDR Football 1989/90 at rsssf.com

FDGB-Pokal seasons
East
Cup